On 12 October 1960, chairman of the Japan Socialist Party, was assassinated at Hibiya Public Hall in Tokyo. During a televised debate, 17-year-old right-wing ultranationalist Otoya Yamaguchi charged onto the stage and fatally stabbed Asanuma with a wakizashi, a type of traditional short sword. Yamaguchi committed suicide while in custody.

The assassination weakened the Japan Socialist Party, inspired a series of copycat crimes, and made Yamaguchi an enduring hero and subsequently a martyr to the Greater Japan Patriotic Party and other Japanese far-right groups.

Background

Asanuma was a charismatic figure on the Japanese Left. In 1959, Asanuma had sparked outrage in Japan by visiting Communist China and declaring the United States "the shared enemy of China and Japan" during a speech in Beijing.

Upon returning to Japan, Asanuma became one of the key leaders and main public faces of the massive Anpo protests against the U.S.-Japan Security Treaty, leading a number of mass marches on the Japanese National Diet. Right-wing groups and individuals, such as Bin Akao and his , became convinced that the massive leftist protests were a sign that Japan was on the verge of a communist revolution and mobilized to prevent such an eventuality.

Akao and the Greater Japan Patriotic Party were part of a sizable segment of the Japanese Right who were extremely pro-American and thus strongly in favor of the U.S.-Japan military alliance. Akao and others who shared his worldview were thus doubly upset with Asanuma for portraying the U.S. as Japan's main enemy on his trip to China and for so actively opposing the Security Treaty.

The perpetrator

Yamaguchi was born on 22 February 1943 in Yanaka, Taitō ward, Tokyo, the son of a high-ranking officer in the Japan Ground Self-Defense Forces. Beginning in early childhood, Yamaguchi began reading newspapers. Angered by what he read, he became vehemently critical of politicians and later interested in nationalist movements. Through his older brother's influence, he began attending speeches and participating in right-wing protests. At age 16, he formally joined ultranationalist Bin Akao's Greater Japan Patriotic Party (大日本愛国党, Dai Nippon Aikokutō).

Akao was virulently anti-communist and strongly pro-United States. When Asanuma-lead protesters staged the massive Anpo protests, Akao became convinced Japan was on the verge of a communist revolution and began to stage counter-protests. Yamaguchi participated in these counter-protests, and was arrested and released 10 times over the course of 1959 and 1960.

Over the course of the Anpo protests, Yamaguchi became further disillusioned with Akao's leadership, and later resigned from the party. In his testimony given to police, he stated that he resigned from Akao's party in order to "lay [his] hands on a weapon" and be free to take more "decisive action."

Assassination

On October 12, 1960, Asanuma was participating in a televised election debate at Hibiya Public Hall in central Tokyo, featuring the leaders of the three major political parties. Also scheduled to participate were Suehiro Nishio of the Democratic Socialist Party and prime minister Hayato Ikeda of the ruling Liberal Democratic Party. The debate was sponsored by the Japanese Elections Commission, the Alliance for Clean Elections and national broadcaster NHK, which was also televising the event. There was also an audience of 2,500 people in the hall.

Nishio spoke first, and at 3:00 p.m., Asanuma advanced to the podium and began his speech. Immediately, right-wing groups in the audience began loudly heckling him, and the television microphones and reporters sitting in the front row could not hear him, forcing the NHK moderator to interrupt and call for calm. At 3:05 p.m., as the audience finally calmed down and Asanuma resumed speaking, Yamaguchi rushed onto the stage and made a deep thrust into Asanuma's left flank with a  samurai short sword (wakizashi) that he had stolen from his father. Yamaguchi then tried to turn the sword on himself but was swarmed and detained by bystanders.

At the time of the murder, Yamaguchi had a note in his pocket that read: 

Asanuma was immediately rushed out of the hall and to a nearby hospital. Initially, Asanuma was believed to have not been seriously wounded because no external bleeding was visible. However, Yamaguchi's deep stab had punctured Asanuma's aorta. He died within minutes from massive internal bleeding before he reached the hospital.

Aftermath

Ikeda's memorial speech
The Ikeda administration had been riding high going into the election debate. Ikeda's newly announced Income Doubling Plan had proven popular, and polls showed his party in a strong position heading toward the election. However, on the night of Asanuma's assassination, approximately 20,000 protesters spontaneously flooded the streets of Tokyo calling for the entire Ikeda cabinet to resign in order to take responsibility for failing to ensure Asanuma's safety. Ikeda and his advisors worried that a new protest movement might arise that would be the second coming of the Anpo protests that had toppled the cabinet of his immediate predecessor, Kishi Nobusuke.

To respond to the crisis, Ikeda took the unusual step of delivering a memorial speech at a plenary session of the Diet on October 18. The Socialist Party Diet members vocally opposed the speech. Despite Ikeda's reputation as a poor public speaker and the expectation that he would give a short boilerplate speech, Ikeda surprised the crowd by delivering a lengthy oration in which he offered an eloquent and generous assessment of Asanuma's love for his country and the Japanese people as well as his hard work ethic. The speech was reported to have moved many Diet members to tears.

Ikeda's party went on to win the election, increasing its number of seats in the Diet, although Asanuma's Japan Socialist Party also fared well.

Yamaguchi's imprisonment and suicide
Following the assassination, Yamaguchi was arrested and imprisoned awaiting trial. Throughout his imprisonment, he remained calm and composed and freely gave extensive testimony to police. Yamaguchi consistently asserted that he had acted alone and without any direction from others. Finally, on November 2, he wrote "Long live the Emperor" (天皇陛下万歳, tennōheika banzai)  and “Would that I had seven lives to give for my country” (七生報国, shichisei hōkoku) on the wall of his cell using toothpaste, the latter a reference to the last words of 14th-century samurai Kusunoki Masashige, and hanged himself with knotted bed sheets.

Legacies

Decline of the Japan Socialist Party
The Japan Socialist Party had been an unhappy marriage between far-left socialists, centrist socialists and right socialists who had been forced together in order to oppose the consolidation of conservative parties into the Liberal Democratic Party in 1955. Asanuma was a charismatic figure who had been able to hold many of these mutually antagonistic factions together through the force of his personality. Under Asanuma's leadership, the party had won an increasing amount of seats in the Diet in every election over the latter half of the 1950s and seemed to be gathering momentum. Asanuma's death deprived the party of his adroit leadership, and thrust Saburō Eda into the leadership role instead. Eda rapidly took the party in a more centrist direction, far faster than the left socialists were ready to accept. This led to growing infighting within the party and drastically damaged its ability to present a cohesive message to the public. Over the rest of the 1960s and going forward, the number of seats the socialists held in the Diet continued to decline until the party's extinction in 1996.

Television, Kenzaburō Ōe novelas, and copycat crimes

Because Asanuma's assassination took place in front of television cameras, it was repeatedly shown on television for weeks and was seen by almost everyone in Japan with access to a television. Within a few weeks of the assassination, Nobel Prize-winning author Kenzaburō Ōe wrote two novellas, Seventeen and The Death of a Political Youth, that were obviously inspired by Yamaguchi's actions, although he was not mentioned by name.

Yamaguchi's actions and the massive publicity that they received inspired a rash of copycat crimes, as a number of political figures became targets of assassination plots and attempts over the next few years. In February 1961, at seventeen years of age, right-wing youth Kazutaka Komori attempted to assassinate the publisher of the magazine Chūō Kōron. Komori was said to have been directly inspired by Yamaguchi's actions.

Yasushi Nagao photograph

A photograph of the moment immediately after Yamaguchi stabbed Asanuma was taken by Mainichi Shinbun newspaper photographer Yasushi Nagao, who had been assigned to cover the debate. As Yamaguchi rushed Asanuma, Nagao instinctively adjusted the focal distance of his lens from 4,5 m (15 ft.) to 3 meters (10 ft.) and captured an extremely clear image of the assassination. Nagao's photograph won the World Press Photo of the Year award for 1960, and won the 1961 Pulitzer Prize. Today it is still found in collections as among the greatest photographs of the 20th century. The photograph allowed Nagao to leave Japan and travel the world at a time when Japanese people were generally not granted permission to travel overseas. He was able to quit his job at Mainichi in 1962 and parlay his fame into a career as a freelance photographer.

Yamaguchi becomes a martyr
Yamaguchi became a hero and martyr to several Japanese far-right groups. On December 15, 1960, a large number of Japanese far-right groups gathered in the Hibiya Public Hall where the assassination had taken place to hold a "National Memorial Service for Our Martyred Brother Yamaguchi Otoya." The Greater Japan Patriotic Party has continued to hold an annual memorial service for Yamaguchi every year on November 2, the anniversary of his suicide. An especially large event was held on November 2, 2010, the 50th anniversary of his suicide.

See also
 List of assassinations in Asia
Assassination of Shinzo Abe

Notes

References

Further reading

Assassinations in Japan
Anti-communist terrorism
Filmed assassinations
1960 in Japan
1960 in Tokyo
October 1960 events in Asia
Far-right politics in Japan
Murder in Japan
Terrorist incidents in Japan in 1960
Terrorist incidents in Tokyo
1960 murders in Japan